The 1952 Holy Cross Crusaders baseball team represented the College of the Holy Cross in the 1952 NCAA baseball season. The Crusaders played their home games at Fitton Field. The team was coached by Jack Barry in his 32nd season at Holy Cross.

The Crusaders won the College World Series, defeating the Missouri Tigers in the championship game.

Roster

Schedule

Awards and honors 
James O'Neill
 All-America First Team
 College World Series Most Outstanding Player

References 

Holy Cross
Holy Cross Crusaders baseball seasons
College World Series seasons
NCAA Division I Baseball Championship seasons